Khok Chamrae  is a tambon (subdistrict) located in the central region of Thung Si Udom district, in Ubon Ratchathani Province, Thailand. In 2021, it had a population of 6,056 people. Neighbouring subdistricts are (clockwise from the south) Na Kasem, Kut Ruea, Kut Salao, Na Hom, Nong Om, and Som Sa-at.

History
The tambon was founded in 1991 by incorporating eight settlements in the southern part of Nong Om in the Det Udom district. A year later, both Khok Chamrae and its parent tambon, together with three other subdistricts, including Thung Thoeng, Na Kasem, and Kut Ruea, were split off from Det Udom district to create a minor district (king amphoe) called Thung Si Udom. However, the inclusion of tambon Thung Thoeng into the new district was undone a year later, on June 1.

Geography
The tambon is located in the central region of the Thung Si Udom district, on the river plains of the Chamrae Creek (ห้วยชำแระ), one of the tributaries of the Lam Dom Yai River (ลำโดมใหญ่).

Administration
The subdistrict of Khok Chamrae is divided into nine administrative villages (mubans; หมู่บ้าน), one of which, Khok Chamrae village, was further divided into two community groups (Mu; หมู่). The entire area is governed by the Subdistrict Administrative Organization of Khok Chamrae (องค์การบริหารส่วนตำบลโคกชำแระ; Khok Chamrae SAO).

As of the 2021 census, it had a population of 6,056 people with 2,059 households. The following is a list of the subdistrict's mubans, which roughly correspond to the villages.

References

Tambon of Ubon Ratchathani Province